Sinomegaceros is an extinct genus of deer known from the Early to Late Pleistocene of Central and East Asia. It is considered to be part of the group of "giant deer" (often referred to collectively as members of the tribe Megacerini), with a probable close relationship to Megaloceros. Many members of the genus are noted for their distinctive palmate antler brow tines.

Taxonomy 

The first species of the genus S. ordosianus and S. pachyosteus were named by pioneering Chinese paleontologist C. C. Young as species of Cervus in 1932 for material from Zhoukoudian. In a review of the paper the subsequent year Dietrich created the name Sinomegaceros as a subgenus of Cervus to house the species, with S. pachyosteus as the type species. Due to the fact that the name was not published in a formal research paper, it was not widely used for several decades after publication. The species S. yabei was named in 1938. In the following decades various researchers considered it a subgenus of Megaloceros, or a distinct genus.  Several named species are likely to be junior synonyms. The best known species are Sinomegaceros yabei from the Middle to Late Pleistocene of Japan, alongside Sinomegaceros pachyosteus from the late Early Pleistocene to Late Pleistocene of China.

Evolution 
The oldest known species in China is S. konwanlinensis from the lower Lishui Formation, around 1.1-1.15 Million years ago (Ma). S. pachyosteus appears around 1 Ma. Among the youngest known dates of S. ordosianus are around 35-50 kya in the Ordos. S. yabei first appears in the latter half of the Middle Pleistocene in Japan. It has been suggested that both S. pachyosteus and S. yabei ultimately derive from S. konwanlinensis. While often stated to have become extinct around 12,000 years ago, a lack of high-quality radiocarbon dates makes the time of extinction uncertain for S. yabei, and it may have become extinct thousands of years earlier during or prior to the Last Glacial Maximum, sometime after 40,000 years ago.

Relationship with humans 
Fossil of S. yabei at Lake Nojiri in Nagano Prefecture of Honshu, Japan, dating to approximately 37,900 to 60,400 years BP have been found together with many lithic and bone tool artifacts, suggesting that the deer were butchered by humans at the site.

References 

Cervinae
Pleistocene mammals of Asia
Prehistoric even-toed ungulate genera